Clear Island Waters is a suburb of the City of Gold Coast in Queensland, Australia.

Geography
The suburb is a mid-to-high socioeconomic residential area surrounding the artificial canals of Clear Island Lake and Boobegan Creek.

History
The area that is now Clear Island Waters was a dairy community in the south and rural wetlands in the north in the early stages of the 20th century.

The suburb began to build a reputation as an exclusive and upper class area in 1967 when property developer Bruce Small, who became Gold Coast Mayor later that year, convinced a group of wealthy golfers to purchase his 92-acre landholding at Cypress Gardens for $43,240 to build the Surfers Paradise Golf Club.

In 1986, St Vincent's Primary School relocated from Surfers Paradise to Clear Island Waters and the Sacred Heart Parish Church was opened on an adjacent block of land after the parish priest Dr Owen Oxenham initiated the move.

The median age of the Clear Island Waters population was 49 years, 12 years above the national median of 37.  56.7% of people living in Clear Island Waters were born in Australia. The other top responses for country of birth were England 6.9%, New Zealand 6.8%, South Africa 2.6%, China 2.3%, Taiwan 1.6%. 75.7% of people spoke only English at home; the next most common languages were 4.3% Mandarin, 2.2% Cantonese, 1.6% Japanese, 1.2% Italian, 1% French.

Facilities
Clear Island Waters is primarily a residential suburb, and most major facilities are accessible from adjacent suburbs. Surfside Buslines provide public transport throughout the city.

Schools
St Vincent's Primary School is a Catholic primary (Prep-6) school for boys and girls at Fairway Drive at the north-eastern end of the suburb. In 2017, the school had an enrolment of 764 students with 45 teachers (40 full-time equivalent) and 21 non-teaching staff (16 full-time equivalent).

The nearest government primary school is in nearby Broadbeach and neighboring Robina and Merrimac.

There are no secondary schools in Clear Island waters. The nearest government secondary school is Merrimac State High School in neighboring Mermaid Waters. Other nearby secondary schools are in Robina, Merrimac and Carrara.

Sport
The Surfers Paradise Golf Club and Surfers Paradise Tennis Club are both located inside the suburb on Fairway Drive. Association football club Merrimac F.C. is located in the north-eastern corner of the suburb and is run by the adjacent Italo-Australian club. Several Australian rules football clubs 
including the Broadbeach Cats, Carrara Saints, Robina Roos are based in the neighbouring suburbs of Mermaid Waters, Carrara and Robina, as well as the city's professional AFL team, the Gold Coast Suns, who are based at the neighbouring Carrara Stadium. The Surfers Paradise Dolphins rugby union team is based in the northern neighbouring suburb of Broadbeach Waters.

References

External links

 

Suburbs of the Gold Coast, Queensland